The Guru Papers: Masks of Authoritarian Power (1993) was written by Diana Alstad and Joel Kramer (Frog Books).

References

Political books